Yurii Vasylyovych Kostenko (born 1945) is a Ukrainian diplomat. Ambassador Extraordinary and Plenipotentiary of Ukraine to the People's Republic of China.

Biography 
Born in the city of Kyiv November 6, 1945. Taras Shevchenko National University of Kyiv (1968), department of history;

1968 – 1971 – Attaché, Third Secretary, Department of International Organizations, Ministry of Foreign Affairs of the Ukrainian Soviet Socialist Republic;

1971 – 1972 – Service in the Armed Forces;

1972 – 1975 – Third Secretary in the reserve, Third, Second Secretary of the General Secretariat of the Ministry of Foreign Affairs;

1975 – 1984 – Assistant to the Minister, First Secretary, Counselor, Department of International Organizations of the Ministry of Foreign Affairs;

1984 – 1985 – Executive Secretary of the Ukrainian SSR Commission on UNESCO affairs;

1985 – 1988 – Head of the Personnel Department of the Ministry of Foreign Affairs;

1988 – 1994 – Permanent Representative of Ukraine to International Organizations in Vienna;

1992 – 1994 – Ambassador Extraordinary and Plenipotentiary of Ukraine to the Austrian Republic; Head of the Ukrainian delegation to the Vienna negotiations of security and cooperation in Europe;

1994 – 1997 – Ambassador Extraordinary and Plenipotentiary of Ukraine to the Germany;

1997 – 2001 – Ambassador-at-Large, Inspector-General of the Ministry of Foreign Affairs of Ukraine

2001 – 2006 – Ambassador Extraordinary and Plenipotentiary of Ukraine to Japan

2004 – 2006 – Ambassador Extraordinary and Plenipotentiary of Ukraine to the Philippines

2006 – 2008 – Deputy minister for Foreign Affairs of Ukraine

2008 – 2009 – Acting First Deputy minister for Foreign Affairs of Ukraine

August 2009 – 12.09.2012 — Ambassador Extraordinary and Plenipotentiary of Ukraine to the People's Republic of China.

References

External links 
 Ambassador of Ukraine in China
 An awarding ceremony of a group of talented Chinese artists from the Academy of Painting and Calligraphy of the Ministry of Culture of China by the "Certificate of the Ambassador of Ukraine to China Yurii Kostenko"
 Yurii Kostenko-Ukrainian Ambassador to China

1945 births
Living people
Diplomats from Kyiv
Ambassadors of Ukraine to China
Ambassadors of Ukraine to Austria
Ambassadors of Ukraine to Germany
Ambassadors of Ukraine to Japan
Ambassadors of Ukraine to the Philippines
Taras Shevchenko National University of Kyiv alumni